Newcastle City Council is the local government authority for the city and metropolitan borough of Newcastle upon Tyne. The council consists of 78 councillors, three for each of the 26 wards in the city. It is currently controlled by the Labour Party, led by Nick Kemp. Karen Robinson serves as the Lord Mayor and Veronica Dunn serves as Deputy Lord Mayor and Sheriff. The council is a member of the North of Tyne Combined Authority.

Political control

 election, there are 52 Labour councillors, 20 Liberal Democrat councillors, three Newcastle Independent councillors and three Independent councillors.

Wards
Newcastle has 26 electoral wards. Each electoral ward has three councillors, representing and elected exclusively by the voting population of each ward. Following an electoral review in 2016, the current wards and boundaries were introduced in May 2018.

See also
Newcastle Upon Tyne Youth Council
List of Lord Mayors of Newcastle-upon-Tyne

References
 Newcastle Council census 2001

External links

 
 
 

Politics of Newcastle upon Tyne
Metropolitan district councils of England
Local education authorities in England
Local authorities in Tyne and Wear
Billing authorities in England
Leader and cabinet executives
1974 establishments in England